Henry Wylie Moore (born 2 November 1923) was the second Bishop of the Anglican Diocese of Cyprus and the Gulf. Born in 1923, his first job after leaving school was as a clerk with the LMS railway. From 1941 until 1946 he served in the armed forces, firstly with the King's Regiment (Liverpool), and latterly with the Rajputana Rifles. In 1948 he graduated from the University of Liverpool and after a period of study at Wycliffe Hall, Oxford was ordained in 1951, his first post being a curacy at Farnworth, Cheshire. After a period as a missionary in Khuzistan he held incumbencies at Burnage and Middleton. This was followed by a decade of service as Home Secretary then General Secretary of the CMS that lead in turn to his elevation to the episcopate.

Notes

1923 births
Living people
Alumni of the University of Leeds
Alumni of the University of Liverpool
Anglican bishops in Cyprus and the Gulf
King's Regiment (Liverpool) officers
Indian Army personnel of World War II
British expatriates in Cyprus
British Army personnel of World War II